This is a list of properties and districts in Baldwin County, Georgia that are listed on the National Register of Historic Places (NRHP).

Current listings

|}

Former listings

|}

See also

 National Register of Historic Places listings in Georgia
 List of National Historic Landmarks in Georgia (U.S. state)

References

Baldwin
Baldwin County, Georgia
National Register of Historic Places in Baldwin County, Georgia